Una, better known as Goliath, is a Papuan language spoken in Yahukimo Regency, Highland Papua.

Dialects are (Western) Una, Bomela, Tanime, Eastern Sela, Kinome. Eastern Una is closer to Ketengban.

References
John Louwerse, 1988, The morphosyntax of Una in relation to discourse structure

Mek languages
Languages of western New Guinea